Telemax may refer to:

Telemax (tower), telecommunication tower in Hanover, Germany
Telemax (TV network), Mexican broadcast television network